The Devil’s Ridge Ultra (a race of  the China Mountain Trails such as the Yading Skyrun) is an international skyrunning competition held for the first time in 2016. It runs every year in September in the Gobi Desert (China), and is valid for the Skyrunner World Series.

Races
 Devil’s Ridge 30, a SkyRace (30 km / 781 m D+)
 Devil’s Ridge 60, an Ultra SkyMarathon (60 km / 2154 m D+)

Devil’s Ridge Ultra

See also 
 Skyrunner World Series
 Yading Skyrun

References

External links 
 Official web site

Skyrunning competitions
Skyrunner World Series
Athletics competitions in China
Gobi Desert